The Arab Club Champions Cup is a seasonal association football competition established in 1981 for elite clubs of the 22 Union of Arab Football Associations member associations.

List of finals

Notes

 Both games were played in Baghdad as matches could not be held in Lebanon due to the Lebanese Civil War.
 A round-robin tournament determined the final standings.

Performances

By club

By country

By continent

References

External links
UAFA official website

finals
Arab